La Française Group is a global asset manager headquartered in Paris. It was created in 1975. In 2016, La Française Group was 168th out in IPE’s annual asset management study of 400 firms. The main shareholder, Crédit Mutuel Nord Europe, is a leading banking and insurance group present in Northern France and Belgium with a credit rating of A/A-1 by S&P.

La Française Group has developed an investment platform, ranging from traditional asset classes to alternatives area. La Française Global Real Estate Group, in February 2019 officially announced its long-term partnership with Canadian Pension Plan Investment Board in the development of Grand Paris. The firm acquired Cushman & Wakefield Investors in 2014.

References

External links

Investment management companies of France